Transformers: Beast Wars Transmetals is a 1999 fighting game based on the Transformers: Beast Wars cartoon series and toy-line for the Nintendo 64 and PlayStation. Each version features different mechanics and playable characters.

It contains arcade mode endings for all characters and several mini-games, and was a Blockbuster Video exclusive that was initially only available for rental.

It featured alternate story campaigns for the Maximal and Predacon factions.

Gameplay
In both games, players take control of one of the Maximals or Predacons in a 1-on-1 battle and attempt to deplete their opponent's life through the use of projectile and melee attacks. Each character can change between three different modes: a Beast Mode, a Vehicle Mode, and a Robot Mode. Players can battle against CPU opponents in each game's single player mode, or against a second player in versus mode.

In the Nintendo 64 version, gameplay takes place in a flat 3D arena. Each of the three character modes has different strengths and weaknesses: Robot Mode is the strongest, but usage depletes an "energon resistance gauge" that will prevent the character from attacking when fully depleted. Beast Mode recharges the gauge, but can only use weak melee attacks. Vehicle Mode has higher mobility and does not charge or drain the gauge, but uses projectile attacks that are easily avoided. The game features a single-player arcade mode, with unique text-based endings for each character. A versus mode, team battle mode and several mini-games are also available for play.

The PlayStation version features a top-down viewpoint. Characters move about 3D landscapes and can use each stage's environmental hazards to damage their opponent. Dealing and receiving damage will also build up each character's super meter, allowing them to use powerful super attacks. The game features a single player story mode, in which each faction attempts to move across a map to reach the opposing faction's base, participating in battles along the way. Story mode is split between Maximal and Predacon campaigns, and features FMV cutscenes. The game also includes versus, survival and training modes, while various images and videos can be unlocked in an in-game gallery.

Playable characters

The original Japanese releases each feature eight playable characters, including three characters exclusive to that version. This was expanded to 12 each for the North American releases through the addition of four secret characters, all of which are palette-swapped versions of existing characters given unique voice lines. The Nintendo 64 version features an original character, Megatron X, who appears as a secret boss in the arcade mode. In the Japanese release, Megatron X can be unlocked as a playable character by connecting to Kettō Transformers Beast Wars: Beast Senshi Saikyō Ketteisen via the Transfer Pak.

 Airazor
 Blackarachnia
 Cheetor
Megatron
Megatron X
Optimus Primal
Quickstrike
Rampage
Rattrap
Ravage
Silverbolt
Starscream
Tarantulas
Terrorsaur
Tigatron
Waspinator
Windrazor

Plot

Transformers: Beast Wars Transmetals is set in an alternate version of the second season of the animated series, following the introduction of the Transmetals and Fuzors. While being transported back to the planet Cybertron after his defeat in the Beast Wars, Megatron sends a message through time to his past self, warning him of his own defeat. This action creates a divergent timeline in which several Maximals and Predacons gain new Transmetal forms and resume their battles on prehistoric Earth.

The Nintendo 64 version features unique story endings for each character, detailing their actions after defeating the opposing faction leader. The PlayStation version features two story campaigns: the Maximal campaign, in which Optimus Primal leads a team to infiltrate the Predacon ship and retrieve the stolen Golden Disk; and the Predacon campaign, in which Megatron and his henchmen lure the Maximals out of their ship in an attempt to finish them.

Reception

The game was met with negative reception upon release, with the Nintendo 64 version receiving a score of 48.67% from review aggregator GameRankings.

References

External links

Transformers: Beast Wars Transmetals (PS) at TFWiki.net: The Transformers Wiki
Transformers: Beast Wars Transmetals (N64) at TFWiki.net: The Transformers Wiki

1999 video games
Fighting games
Games with Transfer Pak support
Nintendo 64 games
PlayStation (console) games
Takara video games
Transformers: Beast Wars
Beast Wars Transmetals
Video games developed in Japan